is a Japanese manga series written and illustrated by Hideki Yamada. Set in a parallel version of the Taihei Edo period, the series follows Chifusa, a busty kunoichi learning to be samurai. The manga began serialization in Enterbrain's seinen manga magazine Tech Gian in 2005. An anime adaptation produced by Hoods Entertainment aired in Japan from July to September 2011.

Plot
In a land ruled by the Tokugawa shogunate, big breasts mean everything. Those women who have huge breasts are guaranteed wealth and popularity. The women who lack them are not considered "human". Members of the ruling Manyū clan help raise future big-breasted women. Written on a secret scroll possessed by the clan, there are said to be various techniques on how to grow big and beautiful breasts. Chifusa is to be the successor of the clan. However, she takes the secret scroll and runs away with it, hoping to fight against the cruel world that the Manyū clan has created.

Characters

The main protagonist of the series. She is the tomboyish successor of the Manyū ("Magical Breasts") clan and an expert samurai. She is hotheaded, rash and temperamental but is incredibly loyal and kind-hearted. However, she is prone to becoming enticed with buxom women as a result of her time with her mother. This often puts her at a disadvantage against the assassins sent after her due to easily being distracted by the "assets". Despite the fact that she was meant to continue the tradition of the Manyū, she deserts her family because of her hatred of the unfair system with which her family governs (which is judging women's worth based on the size of their breasts) and steals the Scroll of Secrets, which contains techniques on how to enlarge breasts. Because of her inexperience with the technique, initially she can only use it to absorb other women's breasts. After discovering this technique, Chifusa made it her ultimate goal to master it so she could ensure all women in Japan a decent-sized bust. A key part of personality is that she disdains large breasts, how people are treated with or without them, and manipulating people with them (such as large breasted girls at a maid inn). In episode 9, her chest size is 123 cm.

Chifusa's attendant and her best friend since childhood. She is eternally loyal to Chifusa to that point that she also deserted the Manyū clan to go along with her friend. Despite the fact that she is Chifusa's underling, she still tends to give her friend orders, especially when it comes to managing money or picking fights. It is implied several times in both the manga and the anime that Kaede is secretly in love with Chifusa, demonstrated by her envious behavior when Chifusa is around men or her constant attempts at playing with Chifusa's large bosom. It is because of these behaviors that most people who come across Chifusa and Kaede assume that they are lesbians. In episode 9, it is revealed that her chest size is 68 cm.

A Manyu assassin and Muneyuki's bodyguard who is sent by the Manyuu to chase after Chifusa. She is cold and ruthless, showing no mercy against any foes. She is an incredibly skilled swordswoman, her skills matching and possibly even surpassing Chifusa's. She was the first person that Chifusa used the Breast Flow technique on, accidentally stealing her breasts during a duel when both of them were young. After she lost her breasts to Chifusa, Ouka endured the harsh lifestyle of a flat-chested commoner until Muneyuki employed her, ignoring her lack of social position due to her small breasts. It is implied that Ouka is in love with Muneyuki because of this kindness.

Chifusa's sadistic, older sister, and an accomplished shot with the teppo. Unlike Chifusa, she is perfectly happy with her family's form of government and goes to great lengths to preserve it. She hates her sister because even though Chifusa has a smaller chest than her, she was still chosen as the Manyū successor over Kagefusa. At the beginning of both the anime and the manga, Chifusa steals Kagefusa's breasts when she unwittingly uses the Breast Flow technique for the first time. After this incident, Kagefusa is forced to wear an inflating bra and she swears a personal vengeance against her sister. She eventually abandons this grudge after Chifusa promises to return her breasts when she masters the Breast Flow technique. After forgiving Chifusa, Kagefusa's attitude towards life and the Manyū completely changes, turning her into an easygoing and relaxed (albeit still sadistic) person.

Chifusa's brother, whom she initially admires greatly. He is the chief Manyū Breast Inspector because of his great, natural ability to analyze them. It is because of this job that he despises large breasts, since he claims that after years of staring and analyzing them he has grown tired of them. After Chifusa's defection, his darker side comes up, revealing that he is as ruthless as his father and is willing to go to brutal lengths to preserve Manyū rule. It is implied that he is either in love with or holds certain feelings for Ouka.

Kagefusa's assistant and best friend. Very much like what Kaede is to Chifusa, Kokage is eternally loyal to Kagefusa, even though Kagefusa is a lot sterner to Kokage than Chifusa is to Kaede. Kokage is very inexperienced in combat and commonly acts as a spy and reconnaissance agent for Kagefusa, looking for information to track down Chifusa and Kaede's location.

The lord of the Manyu clan, the ruler of Japan and Chifusa's father. He is the leader of the Manyu and the series' main antagonist. He preserves the Manyū's system of rule, in which a woman's worth is judged on by the size of her breasts, through a totalitarian demeanour of government. He is shown to be very cold and vengeful, issuing a death warrant for his own daughter because of her defection and spares no expense to have her stopped.

Chifusa's kind-hearted older sister. She is the most calm person of her family and despite her general mercy and good nature, she still is an enemy to Chifusa after her defection.

The feudal lord of a Japanese province that Chifusa and Kaede travel through during most of the series. He is introduced when he judges a "Breast Shaking Contest" in which Chifusa participates to help an innkeeper who lets them stay at his inn free of charge. After seeing her bare breasts be flashed accidentally during the contest, Mie becomes obsessed with Chifusa and begins to try to find her in order to touch her breasts. He eventually flees from his palace and becomes a simple citizen in a small town, later running into Chifusa and Kaede again. He helps Kaede rescue Chifusa from the palace of a rival lord and as a reward he is finally allowed to play with Chifusa's breasts, an honor he rejects out of respect for Chifusa. He then returns to his palace and resumes his lordship duties.

An assassin for the Manyū clan who was sent to assassinate Chifusa and retrieve the scroll from her possession. She first appears in the 2nd chapter of the manga. She invited a traveling Chifusa to her home where she attempted to steal the scroll but was caught by Chifusa, resulting in a duel between the two of them where Chifusa held her own initially, until Ame revealed her skill by secreting blinding liquid from her nipples at Chifusa's eyes.

Media

Manga
Manyū Hiken-chō began monthly serialization in Enterbrain's seinen manga magazine Tech Gian in 2005. The first tankōbon was released on March 24, 2007, with a total of seven volumes under its Techgian Style imprint.

Drama CD
A drama CD produced by Chara-Ani was released on October 16, 2010, featuring a different voice cast than its anime counterpart.

Internet radio show
An internet radio show entitled  aired on Onsen from July 4 to October 24, 2011. The show is hosted by Tōru Ōkawa and Mamiko Noto, the respective voices for Hatomoto Mie and Ouka Sayama.

Anime
The May 2011 issue of Tech Gian announced that an anime adaptation of the manga was in the works. Produced by Hoods Entertainment, the anime was directed by Hiraku Kaneko, series composition by Seishi Minakami, music by Miyu Nakamura, character designs by Jun Takagi, and produced by Akira Matsui, Hiroaki Ooki, and Yoshiyuki Ito. The anime aired on July 12, 2011, on TV Kanagawa, followed by subsequent broadcasts on Tokyo MX, Chiba TV, KBS Kyoto, Sun Television, and AT-X. The final episode aired on September 27, 2011. AT-X broadcasts of the series were partially uncensored, while it remained heavily censored on other channels. A raw uncensored "Director's Cut" version of the anime became available via webcast on ShowTime's video portal on July 22, 2011. DVD and Blu-ray releases of the series, beginning on October 4, 2011, includes an OVA titled "Binyū Tanren-hō • Nyū-Togi" and a picture drama titled "Kaede no 'Chifusa-sama Oppai Seichō Kiroku'''".

References

External links
 Official manga website
 Official anime website
 Manyū Hiken-chō at Tech Gian''
 

2005 manga
2011 anime television series debuts
Hoods Entertainment
Kadokawa Dwango franchises
Ninja in anime and manga
Seinen manga
Sengoku period in fiction
Japanese LGBT-related animated television series